Yalga is the name of several inhabited localities in Russia.

Urban localities
Yalga, Republic of Mordovia, a work settlement under the administrative jurisdiction of Oktyabrsky City District of the city of republic significance of Saransk in the Republic of Mordovia

Rural localities
Yalga, Irkutsk Oblast, a village in Olkhonsky District of Irkutsk Oblast